The AARP Movies for Grownups Award for Best Ensemble is one of the AARP Movies for Grownups Awards presented annually by the AARP. The award honors the best film ensemble in a movie made by or about people over the age of 50. The award for Best Buddy Picture was first given at the 17th AARP Movies for Grownups Awards in 2018.

Winners and Nominees

2010s

2020s

References

Ensemble